Count Ferenc II Nádasdy de Nádasd et Fogarasföld (6 October 1555 – 4 January 1604) was a Hungarian nobleman. His family, Nádasdy, was one of the wealthiest and most influential of the era in Hungary. In 1571, when Ferenc was 16, his mother, Orsolya Nádasdy (née Kanizsay), using her association with many noble families in Hungary, organized a marriage to the young Elizabeth Báthory (or Hungarian: Báthory Erzsébet), daughter of the Count György and Anna Báthory. The Báthory family were as rich and illustrious as the Nádasdy family, though older and more influential, since they had several relatives who had the charge of Nádor (palatine) of Hungary. Among them, included a cardinal, a King of Poland-Lithuania, and a Prince of Transylvania.

Early life 
At the age of 14, Ferenc became engaged to a ten-year-old Elizabeth Báthory. He invited her to move into the Nádasdy Castle, Castle Sárvár, situated in Vas County in western Hungary. Ferenc, unlike his wife, could barely read and write in his mother tongue. He is said to have had a basic understanding of the Latin and German languages, which he intended to use while mediating the Hungarian wars. His wife, on the other hand, was known to be one of the most educated women of the time. Not only could she read and write, but spoke with great fluency in additional languages, such as Latin, German and Greek.

Family life 
On 8 May 1575, Ferenc and Elizabeth married at Castle Varannó in what is today Vranov, Slovakia. They were 19 and 15, respectively. More than 4,500 guests attended the wedding. By mutual agreement, Ferenc adopted the maiden name of his wife, and not vice versa. At the time, the name Báthory was more honorable than Nádasdy. After the wedding, the new lords of Nádasdy, along with Orsolya and other Nádasdy family members went to live in Csejte.

The Catchtice Castle was built in the thirteenth century on top of a hill. At the foot of that hill stood the village of Csejte, which lends its name to the castle. Built by the Hont-Pázmány family, the castle was intended to serve primarily as an observation post for surveillance of the road connecting Hungary to Moravia, now in the Czech Republic. It was later owned by Matt Csak, of the Stiboríc Stibor dynasty. The Nádasdy-Báthory families purchased the castle property as a wedding gift, along with seventeen surrounding villages.

In 1578 Count Ferenc took over one of the flanks of the Hungarian army. Due to his frequent trips away from home, he did not conceive a first child with his wife for 10 years. Their first child, Anna, was born in 1585  and was later to become the wife of Nikola VI Zrinski. Their other known children include Orsolya (Orsika) Nádasdy (1590 – unknown) who would later become the wife of István II Benyó; Katalin (Kata or Katherina) Nádasdy (1594 – unknown); András Nádasdy (1596–1603); and Pál (Paul) Nádasdy (1598–1650), father of Franz III. Nádasdy.

Military life 
As a soldier, in the Ottoman–Hungarian Wars, Ferenc helped conquer the castles of Esztergom, Waitzen, Visegrád, Székesfehérvár and, years later, Győr. All of these castles were originally held by the Ottoman Empire. Thanks to the intervention of the Count, the Hungarians held a major advantage over the Turks. At this time, the central-southern part of Christian Hungary was under Ottoman occupation. The military career, of Ferenc, flowed beside one of his best friends, the noble Hungarian Nicholas Pálffy, who was considered one of the most important military commanders of his time. Pálffy had the full support of Rudolf II, the Habsburg King of Hungary and Holy Roman Emperor. He was noted for his struggle against the Ottoman Turks, eventually receiving the title of Earl of Pozsony Pressburg, Bratislava. During his long period of military service, Count Nádasdy was known for great courage in battle and also, for his extreme cruelty to Ottoman prisoners.

Death 
On 4 January 1604, Ferenc, the Black Knight of Hungary, died of a mysterious and sudden illness in the middle of a battle. The disease which killed Count Ferenc Nádasdy is still unknown. It is known, however, that he had suffered a disease of the lower limbs for at least two years before succumbing to the illness.

Aftermath

After Nadasdy's death, the wealth and properties were inherited by Elizabeth Bathory. From 1610, a confused, conceptual lawsuit took place against the widow and on 29 December she was sentenced to house arrest in the castle. They could not handle the lawsuit in official way. In July 1614, the testament of the Countess left her estate to her children. The process against Elizabeth ended with her death a month later.   The descendants of Ferenc and Elizabeth were banished from Hungary and went to Poland. Although some returned to Hungary after 1640, that was the end of the noble status of the Báthory-Nádasdy family in Hungary.

References

1555 births
1604 deaths
Hungarian nobility
Ferenc
Elizabeth Báthory